The Temple Emanuel (Hebrew: עִמָנוּאֵל, God is with us) in Denver, Colorado, also known as Congregation Emanuel, is a Reform (progressive) Jewish synagogue.  It was the first synagogue established in Colorado. There are historic buildings of the temple on Curtis Street, Grape Street, and Pearl Street, in Denver.

History

Founded in 1874 with 22 members, the congregation dedicated its first synagogue building at the corner of 19th and Curtis Streets on September 28, 1875. In 1882, Emanuel built a new facility at 24 Curtis Street. It was "the first major Jewish synagogue in the Denver area" when it was built.  which was gutted by fire in 1897. The building was added to the National Register of Historic Places in 1978.

The congregation's third synagogue was built in 1898–1899 and expanded in 1924. John J. Humphreys designed the 1898 building. The 1924 building was designed by Thielman Robert Wieger. In 1957 the synagogue was sold to First Southern Baptist Church and then LovingWay Pentecostal Church in 1977. In 1986 the building was acquired by the city of Denver because of a foreclosure process. The building was listed on the National Register of Historic Places in 1987.

Its 1987 NRHP nomination states:Temple Emanuel is the only synagogue in Denver and Colorado designed in the Eastern-Islamic Style. The use of Eastern-Islamic design for synagogues was brought to America by German Jews who had been affected by the reform movement in Judaism and anti-Semitism prevalent in 19th century Europe. Use of the design reflects the problem of retaining Jewish cultural identity while fitting into the Christian society. As a result, the style was acceptable for a place of worship but did not immediately mark it as a traditional synagogue. The Eastern-Islamic architectural mode particularly suited this purpose in addition to evoking an association with the Jewish origins in the Near East. When Temple Emanuel was built, the congregation was largely made up of German and American Jews. The building is similar to synagogues built in the eastern United States and may have been styled after those built in Cincinnati (Isaac M. Wise Temple, 1866) and in New York (Temple Emanuel, 1868 and Central Synagogue, 1872).

The temple is located in Denver's North Capitol Hill neighborhood.  Pathways Church acquired the building from the City of Denver in 2005.  Pathways Church held services at the building and also ran it as a separate business, the Temple Events Center, until 2013.  In 2013 the building and property was sold to Denver Community Church. In 2022, the church announced its plan to move to a former basketball practice facility at 333 & 375 S. Zuni Street in Denver and to sell the Pearl Street Temple Emanuel building.

Rabbi William S. Friedman, a founder of the United Way, served as Rabbi of Temple Emanuel from 1890 to 1941.

Temple Emanuel officially celebrated its 75th anniversary on November 20, 1949, announcing at the time it was the oldest and largest synagogue between Kansas City and the West Coast.

As "Temple Emanuel", the Pearl Street building was designated a Denver Landmark in 1987.

Present day

The congregation's current home, located on Grape Street in Denver's Hilltop neighborhood, was built in 1956 and added to the National Register of Historic Places in 2003.

Rabbi Joseph R. Black has served as Senior Rabbi since 2010. He was preceded by Rabbi Steven E. Foster who served as Temple Emanuel's spiritual leader from 1981 to 2010 and as Assistant or Associate Rabbi from 1970 to 1981.

References

External links

Synagogues completed in 1882
Synagogues completed in 1899
Synagogues completed in 1956
National Register of Historic Places in Denver
Emanuel (Grape Street, Denver, Colorado)
Emanuel (Grape Street, Denver)
Reform synagogues in Colorado
Percival Goodman synagogues
Victorian architecture in Colorado
Moorish Revival synagogues
Former synagogues in the United States
Former religious buildings and structures in Colorado
Denver landmarks